Tin Gods is a lost 1926 American silent drama film produced by Famous Players-Lasky, released by Paramount Pictures, and based on the play Tin Gods by William Anthony McGuire. Allan Dwan directed and Thomas Meighan starred.

Plot

Cast

References

External links

Poster
Still at silenthollywood.com

1926 films
American silent feature films
American films based on plays
Films directed by Allan Dwan
Paramount Pictures films
Lost American films
1926 drama films
Silent American drama films
American black-and-white films
Films shot at Astoria Studios
1926 lost films
Lost drama films
1920s American films